Zhang Zijian (born 5 April 1997) is a Chinese footballer currently playing as a center back for Chinese club Ji'nan Xingzhou.

Career statistics

Club
.

References

1997 births
Living people
Chinese footballers
Association football defenders
China League One players
Shenyang Dongjin F.C. players
Beijing Guoan F.C. players
Changchun Yatai F.C. players